Kiwyu (Jaqaru for a kind of partridges, Hispanicized spelling Quivio) is a mountain in the Cordillera Central in the Andes of Peru which reaches an altitude of approximately . It is located in the Lima Region, Yauyos Province, on the border of the districts of Carani and Yauyos. Kiwyu lies southeast of Llunk'uti at a lake named Llunk'uti.

References

Mountains of Peru
Mountains of Lima Region